Oy Air Finland was an airline with its head office and base at Helsinki Airport in Vantaa, Finland, which was operating chartered and scheduled flights to holiday destinations, as well as aircraft lease services. The company was founded in 2002 and filed for bankruptcy in 2012.

History 

The airline was established in January 2002 and started flight operations on 3 April 2003. It was owned by three individuals from the aviation, finance and travel marketing industries: Harri Naivo (Chairman and Chief Financial Officer), Mika Helenius (Chief Executive Officer), and Lauri Komi. At March 2007, the company had 210 employees. On 26 June 2012, Air Finland announced that it would immediately cancel all flights and filed for bankruptcy.

Destinations 
As of March 2011, Air Finland operated scheduled flights to the following destinations. The broad range of charter flights offered by the airline is not included.

Cyprus
Larnaca – Larnaca International Airport seasonal
Finland
Helsinki – Helsinki Airport base
Greece
Chania – Chania International Airport seasonal
Heraklion - Heraklion International Airport seasonal
Rhodes – Rhodes International Airport, "Diagoras" seasonal 
Spain
Alicante – Alicante Airport
Fuerteventura – Fuerteventura Airport seasonal
Gran Canaria – Gran Canaria Airport
Lanzarote – Lanzarote Airport seasonal
Málaga – Málaga Airport
Tenerife – Tenerife South Airport seasonal
Turkey
Antalya – Antalya Airport seasonal 
United Arab Emirates
Dubai – Dubai International Airport seasonal

Fleet 
As of June 2012, the Air Finland fleet consisted of three Boeing 757-200 aircraft with an average age of 18 years. They provided space for 219–235 passengers in an all-economy class cabin layout.

References

External links

Official website 
Official website 

Defunct airlines of Finland
Airlines established in 2002
Airlines disestablished in 2012
2012 disestablishments in Finland
Finnish companies established in 2002